Western classical music has a substantial history of music criticism, and many individuals have established careers as music critics. However, concert reviews are not always credited in the daily and weekly newspapers, especially those in the early to mid-20th Century. This selective list of chief music critics (or equivalent title, influence or status) aims to make it easier to find the likely author of a review, or at least the influence of the chief music critic on what was covered and how.

Journalistic newspaper criticism of Western music did not properly emerge until the 1840s. Before then, in England, Joseph Addison had contributed essays on music to The Spectator in Handel's era. Former opera impresario Willian Ayrton began writing occasional musical criticism for The Morning Chronicle (1813–26) and The Examiner (1837–51) and founded the monthly music journal The Harmonicon in 1823. Arts and literary magazines such as The Athenæum (and its critic H F Chorley, writing from 1830 to 1868) sometimes covered musical topics. Specialist music paper The Musical World  began publication in 1836 and The Musical Times in 1844. In France, the composer Hector Berlioz wrote reviews and criticisms for the Paris press of the 1830s and 1840s, as did other French writers such as Gérard de Nerval and François-Joseph Fétis. In Germany, Robert Schumann began giving influential reviews for the Neue Zeitschrift für Musik in the 1830s. But The Morning Post in England was the first daily newspaper to regularly publish concert reports, while The Times is generally recognised as being the first to appoint a professionally competent music critic, J W Davidson, in 1846. Throughout the mid-to-late 1800s Eduard Hanslick became a leading figure in Austria, writing for the Neue Freie Presse.

The presence of music criticism continued to grow, and by the 20th century numerous major newspapers had joined The Morning Post and Times in establishing permanent music critic posts, including The Daily Telegraph, The Guardian, The Observer and The Sunday Times in Britain, and the Chicago Tribune, New York Herald Tribune and The New York Times in America. The late 19th and early 20th century saw the development of a uniquely American school of criticism, inaugurated by an informal group of New York-based, termed the 'Old Guard', which included Richard Aldrich, Henry Theophilus Finck, William James Henderson, James Huneker and Henry Edward Krehbiel. Other leading critics of this time included John Alexander Fuller Maitland, Samuel Langford and Ernest Newman in Britain, and Paul Bekker in Germany.

After World War II, leading critics included Eric Blom, Neville Cardus, Martin Cooper, Olin Downes, Harold C. Schonberg and Virgil Thomson. Influential music critics from the late 20th century include Martin Bernheimer, Robert Commanday, Richard Dyer, Michael Kennedy and Michael Steinberg. In the 21st century fewer newspapers have dedicated critics for classical music, but writers have still been active, such as Alex Ross at The New Yorker, Anthony Tommasini at The New York Times and both Tim Page and Anne Midgette at The Washington Post.

List by publication

Aftonbladet (Sweden)
 Adolf Lindgren, 1874–1905.

The Atlas (UK)
 Edward Holmes, 1826–1838 (and later).

Birmingham Post (UK)
 Stephen Stratton, 1877–1906.
 Ernest Newman, 1906–1919.
 A J Sheldon (1874–1931), 1920–1931.
 Eric Blom, 1931–1946.
 John F Waterhouse, 1950s...?.
 Christopher Morley, from 1988.

The Boston Globe (USA)
 Michael Steinberg, 1964–1976.
 Richard Dyer, 1976–2006.
 Jeremy Eichler, from 2006.

The Boston Herald (USA)
 Philip Hale, 1903–1934.

Chicago Tribune (USA)
 George Putnam Upton, 1861–1881.
 William Matthews (W. S. B. Matthews), 1878–1886.
 Frederick Grant Gleason, 1884–1889.
 Albert Goldberg (1898–1990), 1943–1947.
 John von Rhein, 1978–2018.

Daily Express (UK)
 Francis Toye, leader writer, then music critic, 1922–1925.
 Arthur Jacobs, 1947–1952.
 Noël Goodwin, chief music and dance critic, 1965–1978.

Daily Graphic (UK)
 R. A. Streatfeild, 1898–1902.

Daily Herald (UK)
 Rutland Boughton, from 1912.
 Spike Hughes, 1933-36.
 Stuart Fletcher, 1930s.
 Martin Cooper, 1946-50.

Daily Mail (UK)
 Richard Capell, 1911–1933.
 Edwin Evans, 1933–1945.
 Ralph Hill, assistant music critic from 1933, chief music critic, 1945–1948.
 Percy Cater, 1953–1960s.

Daily News (UK)
 George Hogarth, 1846–1866.
 Edward A Baughan, circa 1904–1910.
 Alfred Kalisch, 1912–1933?

The Daily Telegraph (USA)
 Campbell Clarke, 1855?–1870.
 Joseph Bennett, 1870–1906.
 Robin Legge, 1906–1931.
 Herbert Hughes, 1911–1932.
 Richard Capell, 1933–1954.
 Martin Cooper, music critic from 1950, chief music critic, 1954–1976.
 Peter Stadlen, music critic from 1959, chief music critic, 1976–85.
 Anthony Payne, 1965-1987.
 Gerald Abraham, 1967–68 (filling in for both Stadlen and Cooper).
 Michael Kennedy, staff music critic from 1950, joint chief music critic, 1986–2005.
 Geoffrey Norris, music critic from 1983, chief music critic from 1995 to 2009.
 Ivan Hewett, music critic from 2002, chief music critic from 2009.

Evening News (UK)
 William McNaught, 1933-1939.
 Mosco Carner, concert music critic, 1957–1961.

Evening Standard (known as The Standard, 1827–1904) (UK)
 Henry Frost, 1888–1901.
 Percy Scholes, 1913–1920.
 Arthur Jacobs, 1956–1958.
 Rick Jones, 1992–2002.
 Barry Millington, 2002–2020s.

Financial Times (UK)
 Andrew Porter, 1953–1972.
 Ronald Crichton, 1972–1978.
 Max Loppert, 1980–94.
 Andrew Clark, from the late 1990s (now retired).

Frankfurter Zeitung (Germany)
 Paul Bekker, 1911–1923.

Glasgow Herald (UK)
 Malcolm Rayment, until 1983.
 Michael Turnelty, 1983–2011.

The Guardian (until 1959 The Manchester Guardian) (UK)

 George Fremantle, 1867–1895.
 Arthur Johnstone, 1896–1904.
 Ernest Newman, 1905–1906.
 Samuel Langford, 1906–1927.
 Neville Cardus, 1927–1940.
 Philip Hope-Wallace, music and theatre critic, 1946-1979.
 Colin Mason, 1950–1964.
 Edward Greenfield, record critic from 1955, music critic from 1964, chief music critic, 1977–1993.
 Gerald Larner, assistant music critic, 1962-5, chief Northern music critic, 1965-1993.
 Andrew Clements, from 1993.
 Tom Service, from 1999 to 2003?

The Independent (UK)
 Bayan Northcott, 1986–2009.
 Anthony Payne, 1987–1997.
 Edward Seckerson, chief classical music and opera critic, circa 2009–2012.

Los Angeles Daily News (USA)
 Richard Ginell, 1978–1990.

Los Angeles Times (USA)
 Albert Goldberg, 1947–1965.
 Martin Bernheimer, chief music and dance critic, 1965–1996.
 Mark Swed, classical music critic since 1996.

The Morning Chronicle (UK)
 William Ayrton. Honorary musical and literary critic, 1816–26.
 George Hogarth, 1834–1844.
 Charles Lewis Gruneisen, circa 1845–1853.

The Morning Post (UK)
 Howard Glover, 1849–1865.
 Henry Sutherland Edwards, 1865–1869.
 William Alexander Barrett (1834–1891), 1869–1891.
 Arthur Hervey, 1892–1908.
 Francis Toye, 1925–1937.
 Scott Goddard, 1928.
 Robin Hull, assistant music critic, 1934-1937.

Münchner Neueste Nachrichten (Germany)
 Heinrich Porges, 1880–1900.
 Rudolf Louis, 1900–1914.

Neue Freie Presse (Austria)

 Eduard Hanslick, 1864–1904.
 Richard Heuberger, 1896-1901.
 Julius Korngold, 1904–1934.
 Joseph Reitler, 1906-1938
 Hermann Ullrich (1888-1982), music writer, 1926-1938.

Neues Wiener Tagblatt (Austria)
 Richard Heuberger, 1881-1889.
 Max Kalbeck, 1886-1921.
 Ernst Décsey, 1920–1938.

News Chronicle (UK)
 Scott Goddard, 1938–1955.
 George Dannatt, 1944–1956.

New Statesman (UK)
 W. J. Turner, 1915–1940.
 Desmond Shawe-Taylor, 1945–1958.
 David Drew, 1959–1967.

The New Yorker (USA)
 Robert A. Simon, 1925–1948.
 Winthrop Sargeant, 1949–1972.
 Andrew Porter, 1972–1992.
 Paul Griffiths, 1992–1996.
 Alex Ross, 1996–present.

New York Daily News (USA)
 William Zakariasen, 1976–1993.

New York Herald Tribune (USA)
 Richard Storrs Willis, circa 1840s–1850s (New York Tribune).
 Henry C Watson, 1863–1867? (New York Tribune).
 Gustav Kobbé, circa 1860s–1880s (New York Herald).
 Myron Cooney, 1865–1884 (New York Herald).
 John Rose Green Hassard, 1866–1883 (New York Tribune).
 Henry E Krehbiel, circa 1880–1923 (New York Tribune).
 Lawrence Gilman, 1896–1898 (New York Herald), 1923–1939 (Herald Tribune).
 Virgil Thomson, 1940–1954.
 Herbert Kupferberg, music staff writer, 1942–1966.
 Paul Lang, 1954–1963.
 Alan Rich, 1963–68.

New York Post (USA)
 Henry T Finck, 1881–1924.
 Olga Samaroff, 1926–1928.
 Oscar Thompson, 1928-1934.
 Harriett Johnson, 1943–1971.

The New York Sun (USA)
 James Huneker, 1890s–1902.
 William James Henderson, 1902–1920s.
 Oscar Thompson, 1937-1945.

The New York Times (USA)

 Charles Bailey Seymour, 1849–1865.
 Frederick A. Schwab, 1875–1887.
 William James Henderson, 1887–1902.
 Richard Aldrich, 1902–1923.
 Olin Downes, 1924–1955.
 Howard Taubman, staff writer from 1930, music editor from 1935, chief music critic 1955–1960.
 Harold C. Schonberg, staff writer from 1950, chief music critic, 1960–1980.
 Donal Henahan, staff writer from 1967, then chief music critic 1980–1991.
 Edward Rothstein, 1991–1995, then critic at large until 2014.
 Bernard Holland, staff writer from 1980, chief music critic from 1995 to 2000, then national music critic until 2008.
 Anthony Tommasini, staff writer from 1996, chief music critic from 2000 to December 2021.
 Zachary Woolfe, from April 2022.

The New York World (USA)
 James Huneker (1919-21).
 Deems Taylor (1921–27).

The Observer (UK)
 Edgar Frederick Jacques, from 1894.
 Ernest Newman, 1919.
 Percy Scholes, 1920–1925.
 A. H. Fox Strangways, 1925–1939.
 William Glock, music critic from 1934, chief music critic, 1939–45 (but also served in the Royal Air Force).
 Eric Blom, 1949–1953.
 Peter Heyworth, 1955–1987.
 Nicholas Kenyon, 1986–1992.
 Andrew Porter, 1992–1996.
 Fiona Maddocks. 1997–2002.
 Anthony Holden, 2002–2008.
 Fiona Maddocks, 2010–present.

Philadelphia Inquirer (USA)
 Daniel Webster, 1963-1999.
 David Patrick Stearns, from 2000.

The Plain Dealer (USA)
 James Hotchkiss Rogers, 1915–1932.
 Herbert Elwell, 1932–1964.
 Robert Finn, 1964–1992.
 Donald Resenberg, 1992–2008.
 Zachary Lewis, 2008–2020.

San Francisco Chronicle (USA)
 Alfred Frankenstein, 1934–1964.
 Robert Commanday, 1964–1993.
 Joshua Kosman, music critic from 1988, chief music critic since 1993.

San Francisco Examiner (USA)
 Michael Walsh, 1977–1981.

Saturday Review (UK)
 William Barclay Squire, 1888–1894.
 John F Runciman, 1894–1916.

The Scotsman (UK)
 Conrad Wilson, 1963–1991.
 Mary Miller, 1992–1998.
 Stephen Johnson, 1998–1999.

La Stampa (Italy)
 Andrea Della Corte, 1919–1967.

The Star (UK)
 George Bernard Shaw, 1888–1889.

Sunday Express (UK)
 Ralph Hill, 1940s.

The Sunday Telegraph (UK)
 John Warrack, 1961–1972.
 Malcolm Hayes, 1986–1989.
 Michael Kennedy, 1989–2005.

The Sunday Times (UK)
 Joseph Bennett, 1865–1870.
 Hermann Klein, music (particularly opera) critic, 1881–1901.
 Ernest Newman, 1920–1959.
 Desmond Shawe-Taylor, 1958–1983.
 David Cairns, 1983–1992.

The Sydney Morning Herald (Australia)
 Roger Covell, 1960 – late 1990s.

Der Tagesspiegel (Germany)
 Hans Heinz Stuckenschmidt, 1947–?.
 Albrecht Dümling, 1978–1998.

Le Temps (France)
 Johannès Weber (1818–1902), 1861–1895.
 Pierre Lalo, 1898–1914.
 Florent Schmitt, 1929–1939.

The Times (UK)
 Thomas Alsager, 1817-1845.
 James William Davison, 1846–1879.
 Francis Hueffer, 1879–1889.
 J A Fuller Maitland, 1889–1911.
 H. C. Colles, assistant music critic, then chief music critic, 1911–1943.
 A. H. Fox Strangways, deputised for Colles (who was on active service) during WW1.
 Frank Howes, staff writer from 1925, chief music critic, 1943–1960.
 William Mann, assistant music critic from 1948, chief music critic, 1960–1982.
 Stanley Sadie, music critic, 1964-1981.
 Paul Griffiths, 1982–1992.
 Richard Morrison, music critic from 1984, chief music critic from 1992.

Toronto Star (Canada)
 John Terauds, 2005–2012.
 William Littler (current).

The Yorkshire Post (UK)
 Ernest Bradbury, 1947–1984.
 David Denton, 2000s–2020s.

The Washington Post (USA)
 Paul Hume, music editor, 1946–1982.
 Joseph McLellan, mid-1970s–1995.
 Tim Page, 1995–1999, 2001–2008.
 Philip Kennicott, 1999–2001.
 Anne Midgette, 2008–2019.
 Michael Andor Brodeur, from 2000.

See also
 Music criticism
 Music journalism
 The Musical Times

References

Sources
 
 Dibble, Jeremy and Horton, Julian (ed.). British Musical Criticism and Intellectual Thought, 1850–1950 (2018)
 Dingle, Christopher (ed.). The Cambridge History of Music Criticism (2019)
 Graf, Max. Composer and critic: Two hundred years of musical criticism (1946)
 Grant, Mark and Friedheim, Eric. A History of Classical Music Criticism in America (1998)
 
 
 
 
 
 Langley. L. 'The Musical Press in Nineteenth Century England', in Notes, March 1990, pp. 583–592 
 Maine, Basil. Behold these Daniels: being Studies of Contemporary Music Critics (1928)
 
 Scholes, Percy. The Mirror of Music 1844-1944; A Century of Musical Life in Britain as reflected in the pages of the Musical Times, Novello/Oxford University Press (1947)

 
Music critics
 
 
 
 
Critics
 
 
 
 
Occupations in music